The Permian Basin Petroleum Museum is a museum in Midland, Texas, USA, with exhibits relating to the oil and gas industry of the Permian Basin of west Texas and southeast New Mexico.  Museum exhibits include the geology of the area during the Permian period, the technology of the petroleum industry, racing cars designed by Jim Hall, and paintings by artist Tom Lovell. 

The museum was founded in 1975.  The collections are housed in a  building, with an outdoor exhibit space for large oil-field machinery. The museum is open to the public seven days per week.

The museum maintains a research library containing donated material related to the history of the Permian Basin oil industry. It also houses the Petroleum Hall of Fame which includes over 140 men and women who have impacted the Permian Basin's petroleum industry.

See also
 List of museums in West Texas
 List of petroleum museums

External links
 Permian Basin Petroleum Museum website

Museums in Midland County, Texas
Open-air museums in Texas
Industry museums in Texas
Petroleum museums
Museums established in 1975
1975 establishments in Texas
Energy museums in the United States